Jarapada is a rural town in Angul district, Odisha state in India. It is situated on the National Highway 55,  from the district headquarters Angul.

Tourist places
Nearest tourist places:
 Budhi Thakurani Temple (22.11 km)
 Tikarapada (75.3 km)
 Satakosia Tiger Reserve (42 km)
 Deulajhari Hot Spring(38 km)
 Angul Jagannath Temple (22.1 km)

Other tourist places:
Malisahi Shiv Temple
Para Shiv Shambhu Temple
Jarapada Jagannath Temple

Education
Pattitapana Mahavidyalaya, Jarapada
Pattitapabana High School, Hatapada, Jarapada
Jarapada U.P School, Jarapada
Tukuda High School, Tukuda
Tukuda U.P School, Tukuda

References

Cities and towns in Angul district